Bridgeport is a brand of milling machine and machining center produced by Bridgeport Machines, Inc. from 1938 until 2004, when it was then acquired by the machine tool conglomerate Hardinge, Inc.

History 
The original corporation was founded in Bridgeport, Connecticut, and started selling its machines in 1938. It became famous in the following decades for small and medium-sized vertical milling machines, with an iconic form of quill equipped multiple speed vertical milling head with a ram-on-turret mounting over a knee-and-column base. The American Precision Museum's biography of Rudolph Bannow reports that he conceived the iconic design in 1936 as the logical machine on which to mount the milling head already being built by the Bridgeport Pattern and Model Works (which he owned with partner Magnus Wahlstrom). The first Bridgeport milling machine (serial number 1) is on display at the Museum.

The company’s manual milling machines have been so successful that the term "Bridgeport" is often used to refer to any vertical milling machine of the same configuration, regardless of make. Many other companies have cloned the form. Today the Bridgeport brand still produces this configuration in both manual and computer numerical control (CNC) versions, which such machining centers are now equally prominent as their manual counterparts.

Bridgeport manual milling machines have come in many types and sizes over the years, including (but not limited to) the C head (original), R head (heavy duty C head), M head, J head (and high speed, 5440 RPM version), 2J1 1/2 head (1.5 HP Vari-Speed), 2J2 (2HP Vari-speed), and Series II head (4HP Vari-speed). All of the heads offer variable speeds, the earlier ones via a step pulley (cone pulley) and the later ones via either continuously variable transmission (CVT) systems or variable-speed drive. Typical table sizes are 9″ × 49″ (Y and X, respectively) and 10″ × 54″. Machine tapers for tool holding include Morse tapers (on early models) and the R8 taper (a widely used standard that Bridgeport created) on most models. Both Morse and R8 allow for both collets and solid holders, and a drill chuck can be held by either of the latter. Machine slides are of the dovetail type, and rotary bearings are mostly of the roller and ball types.

Bridgeport Machines Inc. timeline 

1927  Rudolph F. Bannow purchased the Bridgeport Pattern and Model Works
1929  Rudolph F. Bannow and Magnus Wahlstrom began business Association
1932  First Universal Milling Attachment shipped (to Atlas Tool of Bridgeport)
1938  Aug. 8, First Bridgeport Turret Milling Machine shipped (to Precision Castings Corp. of Syracuse, N.Y.)
1939  Incorporation of Bridgeport Machines
1941  Addition to Factory – 2,400 square feet
1944  Addition to Factory – 4.200 square feet
1945  Jan., 5,000 Bridgeport Miller sold (Machinery Sales of Calif.)
1946  Addition of Factory - 5,190 square feet
1948  Oct., 10,000 Bridgeport Miller sold
 1951  Bridgeport Machines Inc. moved to 500 Lindley Street (Dec. 1951 – First Bridgeport Miller shipped from here –  14,476th Miller)
1953  April 30,  Profit Sharing Plan started
1954  March 17,  20,000 Bridgeport Miller shipped
1955  Sept.,  Addition to Factory – 3,968 square feet 
1957  Additions to Factory totaling 22,821 square feet
1959  Jan. 30,  Adcock-Shipley licensed (England)  
1960  Jan., Opened Plant II at Remer St. (in original plant) 
1960  March 17,  True Trace Corporation of California purchased
1960  June 6,   50,000 Bridgeport Miller came off the assembly line
1962  June 23,  Death of Rudolph F. Bannow, President
1962  July 30,  Magnus Wahlstrom assumes Presidency of Bridgeport Machines Inc.
1963  Spring,  Addition of Factory - 17,075 square feet
1963  April 30,  500th employee hired   
1963  Sept. 20,  First Open House at Bridgeport Machines Inc.
1965  Feb.,  80,000th Bridgeport Miller came off the assembly line
1965  Aug.,  Auditorium, cafeteria and additional office facilities completed
1965  Nov. 1,  600th employee hired
1965  Nov.,  Finished renovating and built addition for Plant 3
1966  Dec. 12,  700th employee hired
1967  March 6,  100,000 Bridgeport Miller came off the assembly line
1967  June 11,  Open House for employees and families
1968  March 1,  Bridgeport Machines Inc. sold to  Textron Inc.

References

Bibliography

External links
Bridgeport's official site
Bridgeport - Lathes.co.uk
Various Bridgeport Milling heads - Lathes.co.uk
KneeMills

Manufacturing companies established in 1938
Machine tool builders
Economy of Bridgeport, Connecticut
1938 establishments in Connecticut
2004 mergers and acquisitions